Nigel Douglas Dorward (born 4 February 1966) was a Zimbabwean cricketer. He was a right-handed batsman and a left-arm slow bowler who played for Mashonaland County Districts. He was born in Salisbury (now Harare).

Dorward's debut came during the Logan Cup competition of 1994/95, though, batting at number one, he was unable to make much of an imprint on the scorecard.

Dorward's second and final first-class appearance came in the following season, and while he scored 23 and 3 with the bat, he did not play another first-class game.

External links
Nigel Dorward at Cricket Archive 

1966 births
Living people
Zimbabwean cricketers